Ilkeston United F.C. was an English football club based in Ilkeston.

History
The club was formed in 1904 following the demise of Ilkeston Town.

They competed in the Midland League and FA Cup for many years before disbanding in 1928.

A new Ilkeston Town club was formed in 1945.

Records
Best FA Cup performance: 4th Qualifying Round

References

Defunct football clubs in Derbyshire
Ilkeston
1904 establishments in England
Association football clubs established in 1904
1928 disestablishments in England
Association football clubs disestablished in 1928
Defunct football clubs in England